Letícia Sabatella (born 8 March 1971) is a Brazilian actress and singer.

Biography 
Born in Belo Horizonte, Letícia Sabatella was two years old when her family moved from Itajubá (MG) to the mining town of Conceição das Alagoas, going live in the village of Big Bend Power Plant. There her father worked as an engineer. She has said she learned to appreciate nature in this place full of greenery and people of different nationalities. Today, she lives in Nova Friburgo, a mountainous region of Rio de Janeiro, where she grows organic food cooperative arrangements with employees.

Her political consciousness emerged early in life and was reinforced by the company of people like Frei Betto and Herbert de Souza, who showed her the importance of using her celebrity for something more than making money. Her engagement has become so strong that she went on to live with indigenous people craós (Tocantins) as one of them, and to camp with members of the Landless Workers' Movement to understand their proposals. In addition, she participates in several organizations, is a constant presence in forums, and raises her voice in defense of human rights and the environment. On December 8, 2007, she was in Sobradinho, Bahia, visiting the bishop of Barra, Dom Luiz Flávio Cappio, at San Francisco. The bishop was on a hunger strike for the second time, the first in Cabrobó, Pernambuco, in protest against the transposition of the São Francisco River. Sabatella is part of the non-governmental organization Human Rights Movement.

Her experience with the Indians led her to start a career as a filmmaker. In 2008, she launched the documentary Hotxuá.

She is a vegetarian.

In 2009, she played a cruel Yvone in the soap opera India – A Love Story by Glória Perez. In 2012, she it was confirmed that she would star in the movie The Mother War, a foreign film that will have its co-production between the United States and Italy, in which she will play the warrior Anita Garibaldi.

In 2013, she returned to the telenovela in Sangue Bom, in which interpreted Verônica. In 2014, she joined the cast of Sessão de Terapia, playing Bianca Cadore, a professor of literature who seeks therapy to save her marriage to her husband, Tadeu.

Personal life
On 16 December the same year, Sabatella married the actor Fernando Alves Pinto in São Paulo, after two years of dating, in an intimate ceremony for 350 guests.

Career

Television

Film

References

External links

1971 births
Living people
20th-century Brazilian actresses
21st-century Brazilian actresses
People from Belo Horizonte
Brazilian film actresses
Brazilian telenovela actresses
Brazilian human rights activists
Brazilian socialists